Jürgen W. Czarske is a German electrical engineer and a measurement system technician. He is the director of the TU Dresden Biomedical Computational Laser Systems competence center and a co-opted professor of physics.

Career 
Jürgen Czarske grew up on a farm of 20 hectares in the small village of Garbek in the northernmost state of Schleswig-Holstein. The path in the farming family seemed to have been mapped out for generations, but with success at school and hobbies in physics, chemistry and electronics, perspectives have changed. After graduating from high school with distinctions, he began studying electrical engineering and physics at the University of Hanover until 1991. He was enrolled at the Fernuniversität Hagen (Open University Hagen), too. From 1986 to 1991 he received a grant from Siemens. He carried out several research internships in Munich at Siemens AG. He received his doctorate summa cum laude in 1995 at the Institute for Metrology in Mechanical Engineering at the University of Hanover with a topic from laser measurement technology. From 1995 to 2004 he worked at the Laser Laser Zentrum Hannover, most recently as head of the measurement technology department. From 1996 to 2001 he worked temporarily at research institutions in Japan and the United States of America. After completing his habilitation in the field of measurement technology in the mechanical engineering department of the University of Hanover in 2003, he has been a C4 professor at the Faculty of Electrical Engineering and Information Technology at the TU Dresden since 2004. Prof Czarske is Director of the Institute of Circuits and Systems, since 2016, and of the Center Biomedical Computational Laser Systems (BIOLAS), since 2019. He is Elected Member of Scientific Society for Laser Technology (WLT e.V.), Erlangen, since 2017, and Advisor of the OPTICA-SPIE-Student Chapter of TU Dresden, dresdenoptik.de, since 2022. In 2022 has was selected as outstanding editor for Light: Advanced Manufacturing (LAM) of Nature Publishing, China.

Research 
Czarske is mainly concerned with system technology, whereby ultrasound and laser waves are used. Systems are the entirety of elements that are related to one another and are organized outwardly as a delimited structure. The areas of application of the implemented systems envisaged by Czarske are biomedicine (health), process and production engineering (energy and environment), as well as information system technology (communication). For quality assurance in production, he examines optical in-situ form measurements. Ultrasound-based systems are used for flow measurements in order to investigate crystallization processes. Adaptive optics and wavefront control are pursued by Czarske for multi-dimensional microscopy and for light control in biological tissue. This work is important for optogenetics and medical nanorobots.
Prof Czarske has invented the laser Doppler velocity profile sensor, which was successfully transferred to the market in cooperation with the Company Intelligent Laser Applications ILA R&D GmbH, Karl-Heinz-Beckurts-Straße 13, Jülich. 
The profile sensor beats the Heisenberg limit. To take advantage of the high resolved measurements in both velocity and position, the profile sensor was translated into several applications areas such as flow metrology, production technique and process engineering.

Honors and awards 
The award ceremony took place in September 1996 at the Technical University of Munich.
Berthold Leibinger Innovationspreis (3rd Award), Ditzingen, 7/2008
Senior Member of the Institute of Electrical and Electronics Engineers, 5/2015
OSA Fellow, 10/2015
Fellow of SPIE, 12/2015
Fellow European Optical Society, 8/2016
Full member of the Saxon Academy of Sciences and Humanities (since March 2018)
Joseph Fraunhofer Award/Robert M. Burley Prize of The Optical Society, 9/2019

Laser Instrumentation Award 2020 of IEEE Photonics Society

Fellow of the Institution of Engineering and Technology, 7/2021
Fellow Award (FInstP) of Institute of Physics (IOP), London, UK, 7/2022 
SPIE Community Champion 2020, highlighted by SPIE Director Nelufar Mohajeri, WA, USA, 5/2021 
SPIE Community Champion 2019 for outstanding volunteerism, awarded by SPIE President John Greivenkamp, Arizona/USA, 1/2020

References

External links 

Fellows of SPIE
Academic staff of TU Dresden
German electrical engineers
University of Hanover alumni
21st-century German engineers
20th-century German engineers
Fellows of Optica (society)
Fellows of the Institution of Engineering and Technology
Senior Members of the IEEE
Living people
Year of birth missing (living people)